Representativz are an American hip hop duo formed in 1994 by rappers Supreme The Eloheem and Lidu Rock. The group gained fame through their affiliation with the Boot Camp Clik, with Lidu Rock being the little brother of Heltah Skeltah's Rock, while Supreme being the blood cousin of both Smif-N-Wessun's Steele & O.G.C.'s Top Dog.

The group debuted in 1996 on Heltah Skeltah's acclaimed Nocturnal album, on the track "The Square [Triple R]". Later in 1996, they dropped in on O.G.C.'s Da Storm album, appearing on the song "Elite Fleet". They dropped their first group track on Boot Camp Clik's 1997 album For the People, with the song "Watch Your Step". The duo appeared on multiple tracks on Heltah Skeltah's 1998 album Magnum Force, and followed up in 1999 with an appearance on O.G.C.'s The M-Pire Shrikez Back. Later in 1999, they released their debut album Angels of Death on Warlock Records, featuring appearances from multiple Boot Camp Clik members. Supreme has gone on to release 2 solo albums in 2010 It's My Time...The Eloheem Project and in 2015 Odes of a Street Disciple, but the duo has yet to release another album, although remaining on the Duck Down Music roster.

Discography
Studio album
1999: Angels of Death

Singles
1998: "Wanna Start"
1999: "Spaz Out"

Guest appearances

References

External links

African-American musical groups
American musical duos
Boot Camp Clik
Five percenters
Hip hop duos
Hip hop groups from New York City
Musical groups established in 1994
Musical groups from Brooklyn